Capshaw may refer to:

Places
 Capshaw, Alabama, an unincorporated community in eastern Limestone County, Alabama
 Capshaw Mountain, a mountain located in Harvest, Alabama

People
 Coran Capshaw, a band manager, record label founder, and a real estate mogul
 Jessica Capshaw, an American actress
 Kate Capshaw, an American actress

Fictional characters 
 Neely Capshaw, a fictional character from the TV series Baywatch